Nowe Żochowo  is a village in the administrative district of Gmina Staroźreby, within Płock County, Masovian Voivodeship, in east-central Poland.

The village has an approximate population of 88.

References

Villages in Płock County